Aneurin Henry Thomas Donald (born 20 December 1996) is a Welsh cricketer who has played first-class cricket for Hampshire as a right-handed batsman and right-arm off spin bowler. In December 2015 he was named in England's squad for the 2016 Under-19 Cricket World Cup.

Career
Donald initially learnt to play cricket at Gorseinon CC, where his brother Gafyn still turns out for the 1st XI.

Glamorgan: 2016-2018
Donald progressed through the Glamorgan Cricket Academy, and spent a summer in Australia at the Darren Lehmann Cricket Academy, before moving back to his native Wales in 2016.

On 17 July 2016, Donald equalled the fastest ever double hundred in first-class cricket, off just 123 balls, eventually scoring 234 off 136 balls in an innings that was also his maiden County Championship hundred for Glamorgan.

His form then suffered for the following two seasons, and by the 2018 season he was dropped from Glamorgan's County Championship and 50-over sides, but remained as a T20 opening batsman.

Hampshire: 2018-present
Offered a new three-year contract from 2019 to 2021 by Glamorgan, Donald who has ambitions to play for the England national side, decided for career reasons on 23 August 2018 to sign a two-year deal with Hampshire for the 2019 and 2020 seasons. As a result, Glamorgan offered Donald to Hampshire as a loan player for the remainder of the 2018 season, and he hence moved with immediate effect.

In the 2019 season, Donald broke into the Hampshire County Championship side. In his first first-class game for Hampshire, he hit 75 from 56 balls against Warwickshire, and in July he took the same attack for 173 off 144 balls in a superb counterattacking innings from No. 6. He finished the season with 554 runs at 39.57 with a strike rate of 83.30.

In December 2019, Donald was ruled out of the 2020 cricket season, after tearing his anterior cruciate ligament.

Playing style 
Donald is known for his exuberant and attacking playing style. In the 2016 Under-19 Cricket World Cup he played the first ever 'Scooping Slap Shot' in a match against Zimbabwe.

References

External links
 
 

1996 births
Welsh cricketers
Glamorgan cricketers
Wales National County cricketers
Hampshire cricketers
Living people
Wicket-keepers